Shelton High School may refer to:

Shelton High School (Washington) in Shelton, Washington
Shelton High School (Connecticut) in Shelton, Connecticut